The Ottoman Interregnum, or the Ottoman Civil War (20 July 1402 – 5 July 1413), was a civil war in the Ottoman Empire between the sons of Sultan Bayezid I following the defeat of their father at the Battle of Ankara on 20 July 1402. Although Mehmed Çelebi was confirmed as sultan by Timur, his brothers İsa Çelebi, Musa Çelebi, Süleyman Çelebi, and later, Mustafa Çelebi, refused to recognize his authority, each claiming the throne for himself. Civil war was the result. The Interregnum lasted a little under 11 years, until the Battle of Çamurlu on 5 July 1413, when Mehmed Çelebi emerged as victor, crowned himself Sultan Mehmed I, and restored the empire.

Civil war

Isa and Mehmed
Civil war broke out among the sons of Sultan Bayezid I upon his death in 1403.  His oldest son, Süleyman, with his capital at Edirne, ruled the recently conquered Bulgaria, all of Thrace, Macedonia and northern Greece. The second son, İsa Çelebi, established himself as an independent ruler at Bursa and Mehmed formed a kingdom at Amasya. War broke out between Mehmed and İsa, and following the battles of Ermeni-beli and Ulubad (March–May 1403), Isa fled to Constantinople and Mehmed occupied Bursa. The subsequent battle at Karasi between Mehmed  and Isa resulted in a victory for Mehmed and Isa fleeing to Karaman. Isa was later killed in a bath by agents of Mehmed.

Suleyman enters civil war
Meanwhile, the other surviving son of Bayezid, Musa Çelebi, who was captured at the battle of Ankara, was released by Timur into the custody of Yakub of Germiyan. Mûsa was freed, after Mehmed made a request for his brother's release. Following Isa's death, Süleyman crossed the straits with a large army. Initially, Süleyman was successful. He invaded Anatolia, capturing Bursa (March 1404) and Ankara later that year.

During the stalemate in Anatolia, which lasted from 1405–1410, Mehmed  sent Musa across the Black Sea to Thrace with a small force to attack Suleyman's territories in south-eastern Europe. This maneuver soon recalled Suleyman to Thrace, where a short but sanguinary contest between him and Mûsa ensued. At first Suleyman had the advantage, winning the battle of Kosmidion in 1410, but in 1411 his army defected to Mûsa at Edirne and Suleyman was executed on the orders of Musa. Mûsa was now the ruler of the Ottoman dominions in Thrace.

Mehmed and Musa
Manuel II Palaiologos, the Byzantine emperor, had been the ally of Suleyman; Mûsa therefore besieged Constantinople. Manuel called on Mehmed to protect him, and Mehmed's Ottomans now garrisoned Constantinople against Musa's Ottomans of Thrace. Mehmed made several unsuccessful sallies against his brother's troops, and was obliged to re-cross the Bosporus to quell a revolt that had broken out in his own territories. Mûsa now pressed the siege of Constantinople. Mehmed returned to Thrace, and obtained the assistance of Stefan Lazarevic, the Serbian Despot.

The armies of the rival Ottoman brothers met on the plain of Chamurli (today Samokov, Bulgaria).  Hassan, the Agha of the Janissaries of Mehmed, stepped out before the ranks and tried to get the troops to change sides. Mûsa rushed towards Hassan and killed him, but was himself wounded by an officer who had accompanied Hassan. Mûsa's Ottomans fought well, but the battle was won by Mehmed and his allies. Mûsa fled, was later captured and strangled. With Mûsa dead, Mehmed was the sole surviving son of the late Sultan Bayezid I and became Sultan Mehmed I. The Interregnum was a striking example of the fratricide that would become common in Ottoman successions.

Political titles
During the Interregnum, only Mehmed minted coins titling himself Sultan. His brother Suleyman's coins called himself, Emir Suleyman b. Bayezid, while Musa's coins stated, Musa b. Bayezid. No coins of Isa's have survived.

Notes

References

Bibliography
 
 
 
 
 

 
Byzantine Empire–Ottoman Empire relations
1410s in the Ottoman Empire
1400s in the Ottoman Empire
Wars of succession involving the states and peoples of Asia
1400s conflicts
1410s conflicts
Ottoman period in the Balkans
Ottoman period in Anatolia
Wars of succession involving the states and peoples of Europe